David Penashue is an Innu rock singer and songwriter from the Atlantic province of Newfoundland and Labrador, Canada.  He is the founder of the group Tipatchimun.

References

External links
 Profile on Atlantic Seabreeze
 Information from Newfoundland and Labrador Heritage site

21st-century First Nations people
Innu people
First Nations musicians
Living people
Musicians from Newfoundland and Labrador
Year of birth missing (living people)